Kyungôn is a village in Pathein Township, Pathein District, in the Ayeyarwady Region of northern-central Myanmar. It lies beside a former oxbow lake of the Pathein River west of the river at the edge of the flood plain. The oxbow lake has been converted to paddy.

Notes

External links
"Kyungon Map — Satellite Images of Kyungon" Maplandia World Gazetteer

Pathein